Bernd Schulz (born 12 February 1960) is a German former professional footballer. Schulz joined the youth academy of BFC Dynamo in 1975 and made his professional debut for BFC in the 1979–80 season. He was part of the all-conquering team of the 1980s. He won nine consecutive East German titles, two Cups and the DFV-Supercup between 1979 and 1989. He also won three caps for East Germany in 1984 and 1985, scoring one goal. He ended his career in 1993, having played for SG Bergmann-Borsig and 1. FC Union Berlin.

Schulz was at the centre of controversy in 1986, when, in the 95th minute of the championship-deciding game against 1. FC Lokomotive Leipzig, he earned questionable penalty kick after a challenge by Leipzig's Hans Richter. This led to the referee, Bernd Stumpf, receiving a ban, which had been a rarity in East German football until the mid-1980's. The penalty was proven correct by a new recording in 2000. The recording showed how Richter pushed Schulz with both hands in the penalty area.

References

External links
 
 
 

1960 births
Living people
German footballers
East German footballers
Association football midfielders
East Germany international footballers
Berliner FC Dynamo players
SG Bergmann-Borsig players
1. FC Union Berlin players
DDR-Oberliga players